The equipment of the United States Air Force can be subdivided into: aircraft, ammunition, weapons, and ground vehicles.

Munitions

Weapons

Vehicles

Aircraft
List of active United States military aircraft

Ground vehicles

Attire

Other equipment
CMU – 33A/P22P-18  - Air Force issue Personal flotation device
Distributed Common Ground System- A weapons system which delivers information to Unmanned aerial vehicles

See also

 United States Air Force
 List of active United States military aircraft
 Equipment of the United States Armed Forces
 Equipment of the United States Navy
 Equipment of the United States Army
 Equipment of the United States Coast Guard
Equipment of the United States Marine Corps

References

United States Air Force
Equipment of the United States Air Force
United States Air Force